Play It Loud! may refer to:

"Play It Loud!", an advertising campaign for the Game Boy
Play It Loud! Festival, a heavy metal festival in Italy